The Noire River (French: Rivière Noire) is a tributary of the English River, flowing in the municipalities of Franklin and Saint-Chrysostome, in the Le Haut-Saint-Laurent Regional County Municipality, in the administrative region of Montérégie, in the province of Quebec, in Canada.

This small agricultural valley is mainly served by the route 209 which passes on the south shore and by the rang-de-la-Rivière-Noire Nord road which passes on a segment of the north shore.

The river surface is generally frozen from mid-December to the end of March. Safe circulation on the ice is generally done from the end of December to the beginning of March. The water level of the river varies with the seasons and the precipitation.

Geography 
The Noire River has its source at the confluence of Brandy Creek (coming from the west) and another stream (coming from the South). This source is located between chemin du rang des Savary (located on the south side) and chemin Demers (located on the north side).

  north-east in Franklin entering the agricultural area, to a stream (coming from the south), very close to the hamlet L'Artifice and Chemin des Savary;
  northeasterly in a straight line in the agricultural zone and crossing route 209 and entering the village of Saint-Chrysostome from the side southwest, to its mouth.

The Noire River generally flows north-east in an agricultural area to drain onto the west bank of the English River. This confluence is located in the heart of the village of Saint-Chrysostome, either:
  north of the Canada-United States border;
  south-east of the confluence of the English river and the Châteauguay River.

Toponymy 
The toponym "Rivière Noire" was formalized on December 5, 1968, at the Commission de toponymie du Québec.

See also 
 List of rivers of Quebec

References 

Rivers of Montérégie
Le Haut-Saint-Laurent Regional County Municipality